Olax psittacorum is a species of plant in the Olacaceae family. It is found in Mauritius and Réunion. It is threatened by habitat loss.

References

Olacaceae
Critically endangered plants
Taxonomy articles created by Polbot